This is a list of Maryland State Historical Markers which were first placed by the State of Maryland in 1930 and are currently overseen by the Maryland Historical Trust in conjunction with the Maryland State Highway Administration. The current program was launched in 1933 due to an explosion of automobile ownership within the state. There were 766 markers as of October 2020.

Markers by county

References